The first Biathlon World Championships (BWCH) was held in 1958, with individual and team contests for men. The number of events has grown significantly over the years. Beginning in 1984, women biathletes had their own World Championships, and finally, from 1989, both genders have been participating in joint Biathlon World Championships. In 1978 the development was enhanced by the change from the large army rifle calibre to a small bore rifle, while the range to the target was reduced from 150 to 50 meters.

Venues
The Biathlon World Championships of the season takes place during February or March. Some years it has been necessary to schedule parts of the Championships at other than the main venue because of weather and/or snow conditions. Full, joint Biathlon World Championships have never been held in Olympic Winter Games seasons. Biathlon World Championships in non-IOC events, however, have been held in Olympic seasons. In 2005, the then new event of Mixed Relay (two legs done by women, two legs by men) was arranged separately from the ordinary Championships.

Arranged Championships:

1958  Saalfelden, Austria
1959  Courmayeur, Italy
1961  Umeå, Sweden
1962  Hämeenlinna, Finland
1963  Seefeld, Austria
1965  Elverum, Norway
1966  Garmisch-Partenkirchen, West Germany
1967  Altenberg, East Germany (first event in East Europe)
1969  Zakopane, Poland
1970  Östersund, Sweden
1971  Hämeenlinna, Finland
1973  Lake Placid, New York, United States (first event outside Europe and in the Americas)
1974  Minsk, USSR
1975  Antholz-Anterselva, Italy
1976  Antholz-Anterselva, Italy (Sprint)
1977  Vingrom, Norway
1978  Hochfilzen, Austria
1979  Ruhpolding, West Germany
1981  Lahti, Finland
1982  Minsk, USSR
1983  Antholz-Anterselva, Italy
1984  Chamonix, France (Women)
1985  Ruhpolding, West Germany (Men) and  Egg am Etzel (near Einsiedeln), Switzerland (Women)
1986  Oslo, Norway (Men) and  Falun, Sweden (Women)
1987  Lake Placid, New York, United States (Men) and  Lahti, Finland (Women)
1988  Chamonix, France (Women)
1989  Feistritz an der Drau, Austria (first joint Biathlon World Championships)
1990  Minsk, USSR;  Oslo, Norway and  Kontiolahti, Finland
1991  Lahti, Finland
1992  Novosibirsk, Russia (Team) 
1993  Borovets, Bulgaria
1994  Canmore, Canada (Team)
1995  Antholz-Anterselva, Italy
1996  Ruhpolding, Germany
1997  Brezno-Osrblie, Slovakia
1998  Pokljuka, Slovenia (Pursuit) and  Hochfilzen, Austria (Team)
1999  Kontiolahti, Finland and  Oslo, Norway
2000  Oslo, Norway and  Lahti, Finland
2001  Pokljuka, Slovenia
2002  Oslo, Norway (Mass start)
2003  Khanty-Mansiysk, Russia
2004  Oberhof, Germany
2005  Hochfilzen, Austria and  Khanty-Mansiysk, Russia (Mixed relay)
2006  Pokljuka, Slovenia (Mixed relay)
2007  Antholz-Anterselva, Italy
2008  Östersund, Sweden
2009  Pyeongchang, South Korea (first event in Asia)
2010  Khanty-Mansiysk, Russia (Mixed relay)
2011  Khanty-Mansiysk, Russia
2012  Ruhpolding, Germany
2013  Nové Město na Moravě, Czech Republic
2015  Kontiolahti, Finland
2016  Oslo, Norway
2017  Hochfilzen, Austria
2019  Östersund, Sweden
2020  Antholz-Anterselva, Italy
2021  Pokljuka, Slovenia
2023  Oberhof, Germany

Upcoming:
2024  Nové Město na Moravě, Czech Republic
2025  Lenzerheide, Switzerland
2027  Otepää, Estonia

Men
Bold numbers in brackets denotes record number of victories in corresponding disciplines.

Individual (20 km)
This event was first held in 1958.

Medal table

Sprint (10 km)
This event was first held in 1974.

Medal table

Pursuit (12.5 km)
This event was first held in 1997.

Medal table

Mass start (15 km)
This event was first held in 1999.

Medal table

Relay (4 × 7.5 km)
This event was first held unofficially in 1965. It was a success, and replaced
the team competition as an official event in 1966.

Medal table

Team (time)
This event was held from 1958 to 1965. The times of the top 3 athletes from each country in the 20 km individual were added together
(in 1958 the top 4).

Medal table

Team
This event, a patrol race, was held from 1989 to 1998. 1989–93: 20 km. 1994–98: 10 km.

Medal table

Women
Bold numbers in brackets denotes record number of victories in corresponding disciplines.

Individual (15 km)
This event was first held in 1984. Through 1988 the distance was 10 km.

Medal table

Sprint (7.5 km)
This event was first held in 1984. Through 1988 the distance was 5 km.

Medal table

Pursuit (10 km)
This event was first held in 1997.

Medal table

Mass start (12.5 km)
This event was first held in 1999.

Medal table

Relay (4 × 6 km)
This event was first held in 1984. Through 1988, the event was 3 × 5 km. 1989–91: 3 × 7.5 km. 1993–2001: 4 × 7.5 km. In 2003, the leg distance was set to 6 km.

Medal table

Team
This event, a patrol race, was held from 1989 to 1998. 1989–93: 15 km. 1994–98: 7.5 km.

Medal table

Mixed
Bold numbers in brackets denotes record number of victories in corresponding disciplines.

Mixed relay
This event was first held in 2005, at the Biathlon World Cup finals in Khanty-Mansiysk. In 2005–20, the women biathletes did the first two legs and the men did the following two (except 2006 when sequence was woman–man–woman–man), the women's ski legs were 6 km each while men ski legs were 7.5 km each (except 2005, 2006 and 2020 when ski legs were 6 km each for all relay members). In 2021, the starting gender became the result of a alternation: for the first time, men opened the relay and women closed it. Since then, this sequence alternates for each following edition. The distance skied became the same for all genders and depending on the one running the first leg (7.5 km if men run first, 6 km if women do).

Medal table

Single mixed relay
This event was first held in 2019. Each team consists of two members - man and woman. The first of the team members runs the first and third legs (3 km each), the other team member – the second and fourth legs (3 km and 4.5 km respectively). In 2019 and 2020 the women biathletes started single mixed relay and the men biathletes finished it, in 2021 this order was reversed. Since then, this order alternates for each following edition.

Medal table

Total medals by country
Updated after the 2023 Championships.

Multiple medalists
Boldface denotes active biathletes and highest medal count among all biathletes (including these who not included in these tables) per type.

Men

All events

Individual events

Women

All events

Individual events

See also
 Biathlon World Cup
 Summer Biathlon World Championships
 Biathlon Junior World Championships
 List of Olympic medalists in biathlon

References

External links

Sports 123 biathlon results

 

Recurring sporting events established in 1958